Mamma Moo and the Crow is a 2008 Swedish animated feature film directed by Igor Veichtaguin after an original script by Jujja and Tomas Wieslander featuring the character Mama Moo.

Cast 
 Rachel Mohlin – Mamma Mu
 Johan Ulveson – Kråkan
 Sara Lindh - Bondens fru
 Erik Ahrnbom - Bonden
 Melker Duberg - Lillebror
 Amanda Jennefors - Lina

External links 

2008 films
Swedish animated films
Films based on radio series
Films about cattle
Animated films about birds
2000s Swedish-language films
2008 animated films
2000s Swedish films